The Cardigan Welsh Corgi (Welsh for "dwarf dog") is one of two separate dog breeds known as Welsh Corgis that originated in Wales; the other is the Pembroke Welsh Corgi. It is one of the oldest breeds of the British Isles. Cardigan Welsh Corgis are known to be an extremely loyal dog breed. They are also versatile and can live in a variety of settings.

History
Pembroke and Cardigan Welsh Corgis were originally listed as one breed by The Kennel Club in Britain in 1925, but were declared separate breeds in 1935. The Corgi Club was founded in December 1925 in Carmarthen in South Wales. It is reported that the local members favored the Pembroke breed, so a club for Cardigan enthusiasts was founded a year later (1926). Both groups have worked hard to ensure the appearance and type of breed are standardized through careful selective breeding. Pembrokes and Cardigans were officially recognized by the Kennel Club in 1928 and were lumped together under the heading Welsh Corgis. In 1934, the two breeds were recognized individually and shown separately.

One theory is that both breeds of the corgis descended from a line of northern spitz-type dogs. Another is that they descended from the Teckel family of dogs, which also produced Dachshunds.

The breed was formerly called "yard-long dog". Today's name comes from their area of origin: Cardigan (Welsh 'Ceredigion').

Description
The Cardigan is a long, low dog with upright ears and a fox brush tail.

Originally used only as a farm guardian, they eventually took on the traits of a cattle drover, herder, and many more. They are still highly valued for their herding, working, and guarding skills, as well as their companionship.  The old American Kennel Club standard called it an "Alsatian on short legs". The Cardigan's tail is long (unlike the Pembroke Welsh Corgi, whose tail may be long, naturally bobbed or docked).

Cardigans, which are double coated,  come in a variety of colors including any shade of red, sable, or brindle, as well as black, with or without tan, brindle or blue merle, with or without tan or brindle points. Other unofficial colors can occur, such as red merle, but these colors are not considered acceptable per the Cardigan standard. They usually have white on the neck, chest, legs, muzzle, underneath, tip of the tail and as a blaze on the head, known as the "Irish pattern." Other markings include ticking on the legs and muzzle, smutty muzzles and monk's hoods, especially on sables (a pattern of darker tipped hairs over a basic red coat color.).

Life expectancy is 12–16 years.  Litter size can vary; usually four to six puppies.

Health
The most common causes of death for the breed were cancer (28.3%), old age (24.6%), and neurological disorders (15.2%).

Canine Intervertebral Disc Disease (IVDD) is known to occur in the Cardigan Welsh Corgi. This is likely due to the Cardigan being a dwarf (chondrodysplastic) breed, and these breeds frequently suffer from Type I disk disease. This disease is commonly found in the Dachshund breed.

Temperament
Cardigan Welsh Corgis compete in dog agility trials, obedience, showmanship, flyball, and tracking events. Herding instincts and trainability can be measured at noncompetitive herding tests. Corgis exhibiting basic herding instincts can be trained to compete in herding trials.
 Cardigans are highly intelligent, active, athletic dogs.
 Housepet: They have proven themselves as excellent companion animals. Cardigans are affectionate and devoted.
 Competitive in sheepdog trials, dog agility, competitive obedience and rally obedience.
 Guard Dogs: Capable as guard dogs in spite of their small size.

See also
 Dogs portal
 List of dog breeds

References

External links

 MyCorgi.com (non-profit charity & social networking for corgi owners)

 

Herding dogs
Dog breeds originating in Wales
Vulnerable Native Breeds